Karl CC Mah (born 14 December 1980) is an English chess player who holds the title of FIDE International Master (IM) (1999).

Biography
Karl Mah is two-times winner the British Youth Chess Championship: in 1990 in U09 age group, and in 1991 in U10 age group. In 1993 and 1994 he was an Essex County Youth Chess Champion in the U18 age group. He played for England in European Youth Chess Championships and World Youth Chess Championships in the different age groups. Best result - in 1994, in Băile Herculane Karl Mah won European Youth Chess Championship in the U14 age group. In 1999, he awarded the FIDE International Master (IM) title.

Now Karl Mah is a partner in the London office of Latham & Watkins and is the Chair of the London Tax Department.

References

External links

Karl Mah chess games at 365chess.com

1980 births
Living people
English chess players
Chess International Masters